Dorymyrmex smithi is a species of ant in the genus Dorymyrmex. Described by Cole in 1936, the species is endemic to the United States and Mexico.

References

External links

Dorymyrmex
Hymenoptera of North America
Insects described in 1936